Rat Ice is a trademarked version of dry ice approved by the U.S. Environmental Protection Agency for use in suffocating rat nests. The trademark is owned by Bell Labs.

References

External links
Bell Laboratories, Inc: Rat Ice

Mammal pest control
Applications of carbon dioxide
Bell Labs